The 1972 United States presidential election in West Virginia took place on November 7, 1972, as part of the 1972 United States presidential election. West Virginia voters chose six representatives, or electors, to the Electoral College, who voted for president and vice president.

West Virginia was won by incumbent President Richard Nixon (R–California), with 63.61 percent of the popular vote, against George McGovern (D–South Dakota), with 36.39 percent of the popular vote. Nixon won every county in the state except for Logan County, which McGovern won by 2.62 percentage points. Nixon was the first Republican to ever carry Webster County, the first to carry Gilmer County and Randolph County since Ulysses S. Grant in 1868, and the first to carry Boone County and Braxton County since Warren G. Harding in 1920.

In this socially conservative state, McGovern was largely portrayed as a left-wing extremist due to his support for busing and civil rights, alongside fears that McGovern would legalize abortion and illicit drugs if elected — despite the fact that his running mate Sargent Shriver was firmly opposed to abortion rights.

Results

Results by county

References

West Virginia
1972
1972 West Virginia elections